Nordstromia lilacina is a moth in the family Drepanidae. It is found in India and mainland China. Reports from Taiwan refer to Nordstromia semililacina.

The larvae feed on the leaves of Quercus variabilis. Mature larvae curve a leaf and fix it with silk. Pupation takes place near the edge of the folded leaf.

References

Moths described in 1888
Drepaninae